LWA may refer to:
 Logwell Acres Inc, dairy farm in Pavilion, NY
 Leavenworth station in Washington State
 Lightly wounded in action
 Local welfare assistance scheme, program related to Social Fund
 Long Wavelength Array, radio telescope in New Mexico
 Leader Wrestling Association, wrestling promotion in Peru
 LTE-WLAN Aggregation, a way of combining LTE and Wi-Fi access to improve mobile device throughput
 Little Witch Academia, anime created by Yoh Yoshinari and produced by Trigger

See also 
 Lwa, Voodoo (Voudon) spirits
 LWA, sound power level in dB weighted A, dB(A)